Partick West railway station was a station that served the Partick area of the city of Glasgow, particularly the Thornwood section of Partick from 1896 to 1964.  It was a four platform station on the Lanarkshire and Dunbartonshire Railway, with two platforms on an east–west line with services between Dumbarton and Glasgow city centre and a further two platforms on a north–south line with services between Maryhill and the city centre.

The station was situated beside the imposing building of the Meadowside Granary, which has since been demolished and replaced by part of the Glasgow Harbour development.  Passenger services stopped using Partick West in the 1960s as part of the Beeching Axe which drastically cut rail services across the United Kingdom.

Partick West was one of three stations which served the Partick area, along with Partickhill and Partick Central (latterly called Kelvin Hall).  None of these stations exist now, and since 1979 the area has been served by one Partick station which combines rail, underground and bus services.

Routes

References

Beeching closures in Scotland
Disused railway stations in Glasgow
Railway stations in Great Britain opened in 1896
Railway stations in Great Britain closed in 1964
Former Caledonian Railway stations
Partick